Michael or Mike Turner may refer to:

Arts and entertainment 
Michael Le Vell (Michael Robert Turner, born 1964), English actor, plays Kevin Webster in Coronation Street
Michael Turner (actor) (1921–2012), South African born actor who played numerous roles on British television
Michael Turner (comics) (1971–2008), comic book artist and publisher known for his work on Witchblade and Fathom
Michael Turner (illustrator) (born 1934), British motorsport and aviation illustrator
Michael Turner (musician) (born 1962), Canadian writer and musician from Vancouver, BC
Mick Turner (born 1960), Australian musician and artist
Mike Turner (musician) (born 1963), former and founding band member of alternative rock band Our Lady Peace

Politics 
Mike Turner (Oklahoma politician) (born 1987), member of the Oklahoma House of Representatives
Mike Turner (Tennessee politician) (born 1955), Tennessee politician in the Tennessee House of Representatives
Mike Turner (born 1960), American politician from Ohio

Sport 
Michael Turner (American football) (born 1982), former American football running back
Michael Turner (Australian rules footballer) (born 1954), Australian rules footballer who played for the Geelong Football Club
Mike Turner (cricketer) (1934–2015), English cricketer
Mike Turner (footballer) (born 1938), English former football goalkeeper
Michael Turner (swimmer) (born 1948), British Olympic swimmer of the 1960s
Michael Turner (water polo) (born 1951), Australian former water polo player
Michael Turner (footballer, born 1983), English footballer

Other fields
Michael Turner (banker) (1905–1980), chief manager of Hong Kong and Shanghai Bank from 1952 to 1963
Michael Turner (businessman) (born 1948), former CEO of BAE Systems
Michael S. Turner (born 1949), American cosmologist